Olsson is a common Swedish surname. It is a contraction of the surname Olofsson and it literally means "son of Olof" and seldom also "son of Ola". Notable people with the surname include:

 Åke Olsson - Swedish football player
 Åke Olsson (chess player) (born 1934) - Swedish chess player
 Albert Julius Olsson (1864–1942), British artist
 Anette Olsson, better known as Anette Olzon, Swedish singer
 Arne Olsson, 20th century Lutheran bishop
 Betty Olsson (1871–1950), Swedish suffragist and peace activist
 Börje Kenny Olsson (1977–2007), speedway racer
 Christian Olsson (born 1980), athlete
 Cilluf Olsson (1847–1916), Swedish textile artist
 Dan Olsson, Swedish businessman, CEO of Stena Sphere
 Holmfrid Olsson (1943–2009), Swedish biathlete
 Ingela Olsson (born 1958), actress
 Jan Olof Olsson (1920–1974), writer and journalist
 Johan Olsson (ice hockey) (born 1978), ice hockey forward
 Johan Olsson (skier) (born 1980), cross-country skier
 Jonas Olsson (born 1970), football manager and former footballer
 Jonas Olsson (born 1983), footballer
 Jörgen Olsson (badminton) (born 1976), Swedish badminton player
 Kalle Olsson (born 1984), Swedish politician
 Karolina Olsson (1861–1950), Swedish woman who hibernated for three decades
 Marcus Olsson (born 1988), footballer and brother of Martin
 Martin Olsson (born 1988), footballer who plays for Blackburn Rovers in the Premier League
 Mathias Olsson (born 1973), former professional ice hockey defenceman
 Nigel Olsson (born 1949), English rock drummer
 Otto Olsson (1879–1964), composer and organist
 Peter A. Olsson (born 1941), American psychiatrist
 Peter Olsson (bassist) (–), bassist
 Salina Olsson (born 1978), Swedish Olympic football player
 Sandy Olsson, character played by Olivia Newton-John in the movie version of Grease
 Sten Allan Olsson (1916–2013), founder of Stena Line
 Tage William-Olsson (1888–1960), architect
 Tony Olsson (born 1965), former speedway runner
 Ulf Olsson (1951-2010), murderer
 Vic Olsson, New Zealand rower
 Richard K. Olsson, American Geologist

See also
 Ohlson
 Ohlsson
 Olsen (disambiguation)
 Olson (disambiguation)

Patronymic surnames
Swedish-language surnames
Surnames from given names